Mala Pristava is a village southwest of Pivka in the Inner Carniola region of Slovenia.

History
Mala Pristava formerly included the hamlet of Ribnica. In 1994, territory from Nadanje Selo, Mala Pristava, Nova Sušica, and Stara Sušica was combined to create Ribnica as a separate settlement.

Church
The local church in the settlement is dedicated to Our Lady of Lourdes and belongs to the Parish of Šmihel.

References

External links
Mala Pristava on Geopedia

Populated places in the Municipality of Pivka